Dennis Zuill (born 3 January 1978) is a Bermudian former international footballer who played as a defender.

Club career
Zuill began his career as a defender with Dandy Town Hornets in the Bermudian Premier Division before joining the Bermuda Hogges in the USL Second Division in 2007 for its inaugural season in 2007.

He returned to Dandy Town Hornets after being released from prison in 2011.

Personal life
Zuill was arrested in September 2009 in Atlanta for his involvement in cannabis and cocaine distribution and was sentenced to do time in prison. He was granted a supervised release from a New York prison in October 2011 after pleading guilty earlier in the year. In Bermuda, he was once more charged with drugs trafficking in March 2013.

He is a cousin of former national team striker Aljame Zuill.

References

External links

1978 births
Living people
Association football defenders
Bermudian footballers
Bermuda international footballers
Dandy Town Hornets F.C. players
Bermudian criminals
Drug traffickers